Oak Hill College is a conservative evangelical theological college located on Chase Side in Southgate, London, England. Its aim is to prepare men and women from the Church of England and Independent churches for ministry in the real world.

Overview
The College trains men and women from the Church of England and other denominations for ministry in the real world.  This includes for ordination, community work, youth and children's work and world mission.  Courses can be full-time or part-time, leading to a Certificate or Diploma in Higher Education or a Bachelor of Arts (Hons) in Theology.

It has been associated with conservative evangelical theology since its foundation in 1932, and continues to have a strong emphasis on Bible teaching and theology which is then applied to life and ministry. It is an associate college of Middlesex University. Dr Daniel Strange was for a time Acting Principal following the sudden and unexpected death in January 2017 of Revd Dr Michael Ovey. Dr Ovey succeeded New Testament Scholar, Revd Professor David Peterson at the start of the 2007–2008 academic year. Dr Ovey co-authored the book Pierced For Our Transgressions (Leicester: Apollos, 2006) with Dr Steve Jeffery and Dr Andrew Sach.

The Latimer Trust, an Anglican think tank, is located at Oak Hill Theological College.

Current leadership

President: Revd Johnny Juckes
Vice Principal: Revd Matthew Sleeman
Vice Principal: David Shaw
Director of Operations & Finance: Grant Farrant

Notable former staff
 Gerald Bray, theologian and church historian
 Christopher Byworth, Anglican liturgist and New Testament tutor, later Warden of Cranmer Hall, Durham
 George Carey, 103rd Archbishop of Canterbury
 J. I. Packer, conservative evangelical theologian

List of principals
 1961–1971: Maurice Wood, later Bishop of Norwich
 1971-1986: David Wheaton
 1986-1996: Gordon Bridger 
 1996–2007: David G. Peterson
 2007–2017: Michael Ovey
 2018-: Johnny Juckes

Notable alumni

 Cyril Ashton, former Bishop of Doncaster (Diocese of Sheffield)
 Michael Baughen, former Bishop of Chester
 Michael Bunker, former Dean of Peterborough
 George Cassidy, former Bishop of Southwell and Nottingham
 Elwin Cockett, Archdeacon of West Ham (Diocese of Chelmsford)
 Frank Collins, former 22 SAS soldier (the first to enter the Iranian Embassy Siege) and former Chaplain to the Forces (British Army)
 David Court, Bishop of Grimsby (Diocese of Lincoln)
 John Delight, former Archdeacon of Stoke
 Karowei Dorgu, Bishop of Woolwich (Diocese of Southwark)
 David Gillett, former Bishop of Bolton (Diocese of Manchester)
 David Griscome, former Dean of Elphin and Ardagh
 Philip Hacking, former Chairman of the Keswick Convention
 Peter Hancock, Bishop of Bath and Wells
 Rob Munro, Bishop of Ebbsfleet
 Richard Ormston, Archdeacon of Northampton
 Ricky Panter, Archdeacon of Liverpool
 Christopher Peters, Dean of Ross, Ireland
 Peter Price, former Bishop of Bath and Wells
 Brian Woodhams, former Archdeacon of Newark

References

External links

Oak Hill College
Church of England Evangelical Council
Redeemer City to City

Bible colleges, seminaries and theological colleges in England
Anglican seminaries and theological colleges
Evangelicalism in the Church of England
Education in the London Borough of Barnet
Middlesex University
East Barnet
Southgate, London
Grade II listed buildings in the London Borough of Barnet